Word of Mouth is the fifth album by heavy metal band Vicious Rumors, released on the Rising Sun label in 1994.

"Thunder and Rain Pt. 2" is dedicated to the memory of late Criss Oliva, of Savatage.

Track listing
"Against the Grain" - 4:21
"All Rights Reserved" - 4:42
"The Voice" - 4:13
"Thinking of You" - 4:56
"Thunder and Rain Pt. 1" - 3:15
"Thunder and Rain Pt. 2" - 3:06
"No Fate" - 4:26
"Sense of Security" - 4:30
"Dreaming" - 4:14
"Building #6" - 4:23
"Ministry of Fear" - 4:01
"Music Box" - 1:56

Bonus tracks in the Japanese Import and European Digi-Pack
"Communication Breakdown"
"Paint It Black"

Personnel
 Geoff Thorpe: Guitars
 Mark McGee: Guitars
 Carl Albert: Vocals
 Tommy Sisco: Bass
 Larry Howe: Drums

References

1994 albums
Vicious Rumors albums